Draculo is a genus of dragonets found mainly in the tropical waters of the western Indo-Pacific.

Species
There are currently five recognized species in this genus:
 Draculo celetus (J. L. B. Smith, 1963) (Dainty dragonet)
 Draculo maugei (J. L. B. Smith, 1966) (Maugé's dragone)
 Draculo mirabilis Snyder, 1911 (Wonder dragonet)
 Draculo pogognathus (Gosline, 1959) (Hawaiian wonder dragonet)
 Draculo shango (W. P. Davis & C. R. Robins, 1966) (Shango dragonet)

References

Callionymidae
Marine fish genera
Taxa named by John Otterbein Snyder